Cornelia "Cor" van Gelder (17 April 1904 – 13 February 1969) was a Dutch swimmer. She competed in the women's 200 metre breaststroke event at the 1928 Summer Olympics.

References

External links
 

1904 births
1969 deaths
Olympic swimmers of the Netherlands
Swimmers at the 1928 Summer Olympics
Swimmers from Rotterdam
Dutch female breaststroke swimmers